Marcel Mihalovici (Bucharest, 22 October 1898 – Paris, 12 August 1985) was a French composer born in Romania. He was discovered by George Enescu in Bucharest. He moved to Paris in 1919 (at age 21) to study under Vincent d'Indy. His works include his Sonata number 1 for violin and piano (1920), Mélusine opera (1920, libretto by Yvan Goll), his 1st string quartet (1923), 2nd string quartet (1931), Sonata number 2 for violin and piano (1941), Sonata for violin and cello (1944), Phèdre Opera (1949), Étude in two parts for piano and instrumental ensemble (1951) and Esercizio per archi (1960). Many of his piano works were first performed by his wife, the concert pianist Monique Haas.

Mihalovici was the original composer for the music of Samuel Beckett's radio play Cascando (1962). His Fifth Symphony features a soprano singing a setting of a Beckett poem, and he used Krapp's Last Tape as the basis for a small opera, Krapp, ou, La dernière bande. His memories of their friendship are recounted in the collected work Beckett at Sixty A Festschrift by John Calder, Calder and Boyars (1967).

A strong proponent of neoclassicism, during his career Mihalovici embraced a variety of contemporary styles, with a harmonic language ranging from  chromaticism to serialism. Romanian folk music influenced his unconventional use of rhythmic variation and instrumental colour.

List of Works (by opus number)
(Works with "op. ??" are placed at the point in the list where they are presumed to have been composed)

 op.  6 – Three Nocturnes; piano
 op. 11 – Sonatine; piano
 op. 12 – Dialogues; clarinet and piano
 op. 13 – Sonatine; oboe or violin and piano
 op. 18 – Chansons et Jeux (Romanian Poems); voice and piano
 op. 19 – Impromptu Pieces; piano
 op. ?? – Sonata no. 1; violin and piano
 op. ?? – String Quartet no. 1
 op. 23 – Karagueuz; puppet ballet for orchestra or 4-hand piano
 op. 25 - Trois romances de Victor Hugo, piano and voice, published 1932
 op. 26 – Fantaisie for orchestra (performed at the 1930 ISCM Festival in Liège)
 op. 27 – The Intransigent Pluto, or, Orpheus in the Underworld; opera in one act
 op. 28 – Chindia; radio-orchestra
 op. 29 – Four Caprices; piano
 op. 30 – Trio 'Serenade'; violin, viola, and cello
 op. 31 – String Quartet no. 2
 op. 32 – Chanson, Pastorale, Rumanian Dance; piano
 op. 33 – Concerto (Quasi una Fantasia); violin and orchestra
 op. 35 – Sonata; clarinet trio (E-flat, A, and bass clarinet in B-flat)
 op. 37 – Five Bagatelles; piano
 op. 38 – Divertissement; small orchestra
 op. 40 – Rhapsody Concertante; orchestra
 op. 42 – Prelude and Invention; string orchestra
 op. 44 – Toccata; piano and orchestra (or 2 pianos)
 op. 45 – Sonata no. 2; violin and piano
 op. 46 – Ricarcari, Variations; piano
 op. 47 – Sonata; viola and piano
 op. ?? – Sequences; orchestra
 op. 50 – Sonata; violin and cello
 op. 51 – Counter-Rhymes, 3 songs; voice and piano
 op. 52 – String Quartet no. 3
 op. 54 – Variations; horns and strings
 op. 58 – Phèdre; opera in five scenes
 op. 59 – Sonata; solo violin
 op. 60 – Sonata; solo cello
 op. 61 – Ritournelles; orchestra
 op. 62 – Four Pastorales; piano
 op. 63 – Three Nocturnes; piano
 op. 64 – Etude in Two Parties; piano, winds, brass, celeste, and percussion
 op. 65 – Sinfonia giocosa (Symphony no. 1); orchestra
 op. 66 – Sinfonia partita (Symphony no. 2); string orchestra
 op. 67 – Two Poems by Agrippa D'Aubigne; SATB chorus
 op. 68 – Memorial (Five Motets); chorus
 op. ?? – Symphonies for Present Times; orchestra
 op. 70 – The Homecoming; opera in one act
 op. 71 – Trio; oboe, clarinet, and bassoon
 op. 72 – Elegy; orchestra
 op. 73 – Scenes from Thésée (Ballet); orchestra
 op. 74 – Alternamenti (Ballet); orchestra
 op. 75 – Evening Songs, Four Poems by Yvan Goll; voice and piano
 op. 76 – Tragic Overture; orchestra
 op. ?? – Sonata; bassoon and piano
 op. 78 – Sonata; B-flat clarinet and piano
 op. ?? – Scherzo-Waltz; B-flat trumpet and piano
 op. ?? – Meditation; C or B-flat trumpet and piano
 op. ?? – Novelette; bassoon and piano
 op. ?? – Episode; Horn in F and piano
 op. 80 – Exercise; string orchestra
 op. 81 – Krapp's Last Tape (Beckett); opera
 op. 82 – Sinfonia variata (Symphony no. 3); orchestra
 op. 83 – Improvisations; percussion and piano
 op. 84 – The Twins; opera in three acts
 op. 87 – Musique Nocturne; clarinet and chamber orchestra
 op. 88 – Sinfonia Cantata (Symphony no. 4); baritone, mixed chorus, and orchestra
 op. 89 – Aubade; string orchestra
 op. 90 – Sonata; piano
 op. 92 – Dialogues; clarinet and piano
 op. 93 – Périples; small orchestra
 op. 94 – Symphony no. 5 (in memory of Hans Rosbaud)
 op. 95 – Pretexts; oboe, bass clarinet, piano, percussion, and strings
 op. 96 – Variantes; F horn and piano
 op. 97 – Cantus Firmus; two pianos
 op. 98 – Rondo; orchestra
 op. 99 – Serioso; bass saxhorn and piano
 op. 100 – Cantilène; mezzo-soprano and chamber orchestra
 op. 101 – Recit; solo clarinet
 op. 102 – Melopeia; oboe solo
 op. 103 – Chant Premier (Sonata); tenor saxophone and orchestra
 op. 104 – Texts; viola and piano
 op. 105 – Passacaglia for One Hand; piano
 op. 106 – Follia, Paraphrases; orchestra
 op. 107 – Délié (Cantata); soprano and orchestra (or piano)
 op. 108 – Sonata-Danse; cello and piano
 op. 109 – Malinconia (Cantata); soprano, bass, string quartet, and orchestra
 op. 110 – Sonata; viola solo
 op. 111 – String Quartet no. 4
 op. 112 – Mirror of Songs; flute and piano
 op. 113 – Torse (Meditation); violin solo
 op. 114 – Elegy no. 2; violin and piano

References

20th-century classical composers
French classical composers
French male classical composers
Romanian emigrants to France
Musicians from Bucharest
1898 births
1985 deaths
20th-century French composers
20th-century French male musicians